Paramnesia is memory-based delusion or confabulation, or an inability to distinguish between real and fantasy memories. 

It may refer more specifically to:
 Déjà vu, the delusion that a current event has already been experienced before
 Reduplicative paramnesia, the delusion that a location exists in more than one place simultaneously